Bunker gear (also known as turnout gear, fire kit and incident gear) is the personal protective equipment (PPE) used by firefighters. The term is derived from the fact that the trousers and boots are traditionally kept by the firefighter's bunk at the fire station to be readily available for use.

History 

Historically, firefighters have not had access to the same level of protective clothing used today. Most fires were fought from the outside of buildings, and structures were rarely entered. Early in the history of firefighting, a firefighter's outer clothing were more for warmth and dryness than for protection from fire. In the early 19th century, felt caps were worn of various design and were more for decoration than service; this early headgear did not provide any protection against flame or head injury but did keep water off the firefighter's face. The modern firefighter's helmet was developed in 1830 by luggage maker Henry Gratacap, who was also a volunteer firefighter in New York City. Gratacap recognized the need for a well-designed helmet that provided maximum protection to the wearer. This helmet is immediately recognizable today as the "New York" style of helmet, and little has changed in terms of its shape. The helmet had a brimmed front to affix a face shield; it was usually adorned with a company name and number. The helmet featured eight rib sections on the dome for added rigidity and a long rear brim that channeled water away from the wearer's neck.

Firefighting trench coats, made of leather or canvas and later rubber, were the precursor to modern turnout jackets. Early coats had felt or wool liners to provide warmth in winter. These layers later developed into the thermal and flame protection liners found in today's turnout gear. Earlier rubber coats were much longer than today's modern turnout jackets, reaching down to a firefighter's mid thigh. They were worn with long rubber boots called "three-quarter boots" which reached above the firefighter's knees. This interface of boot and coat left a large gap of protection against fire. This system has since been replaced by the modern combination of a jacket, pants with suspenders, and shorter rubber or leather boots, although some departments still wear the old style of gear.

The combination of modern triple-layer turnout gear with self-contained breathing apparatus (SCBA), personal alert safety system (PASS) device, and modern communications equipment is intended to provide comprehensive protection against smoke, heat, water, steam, flashovers, and even direct flame for a short time. Modern turnout jackets and pants are made of fire retardant fabrics, mainly aramids such as Nomex and Kevlar or polybenzimidazole (PBI). The National Fire Protection Association publishes the requirements for fire protective clothing under NFPA 1971: Standard on Protective Ensembles for Structural Fire Fighting and Proximity Fire Fighting, which specifies "the minimum design, performance, safety, testing, and certification requirements for structural fire fighting protective ensembles and ensemble elements that include coats, trousers, coveralls, helmets, gloves, footwear, and interface components."

Station uniform 

The first component of firefighting equipment is the uniform that a firefighter wears around the station. Its purpose is to provide comfortable clothing that will not become an obstruction when a firefighter is required to put on their turnout gear. Turnout gear is to be worn over the station garments during any call that a firefighter is called upon. 

Another aspect of the station uniform is the station safety shoes, commonly referred to as work boots. These shoes are required to be fitted with safety toes and puncture-resistant soles in most countries in case the firefighter goes out on a call that does not require his/her turnout gear.

The United States adheres to NFPA 1975: Standard on Emergency Services Work Apparel. NFPA 1975's main purpose is that no part of the uniform garment “ignite, melt, drip, or separate” when exposed to a heat of 500°F for 5 minutes.

Protective ensemble 

Turnout clothing can consist of a combination of trousers, suspenders, boots, and a jacket. Modern sets use a trouser/jacket combination. The advantage of this combination is overlapping coverage to create a protective envelope for the firefighter to operate in. 

It has been noted that young children in dangerous circumstances like a building fire may be further frightened by the appearance of firefighters equipped in full turnout gear. Many fire departments have school presentations intended to familiarize children with firefighters and their appearance so as to ensure they will be calm and cooperative during emergencies.

Materials 

According to NFPA 1971: Standard on Protective Ensembles for Structural Fire Fighting and Proximity Fire Fighting (and most equivalent standards in other countries), all turnout clothing must have three components: an outer shell, a moisture barrier, and a thermal barrier. Separating these layers are pockets of air referred to as "dead zones". These layers of air, along with the three layers, help to further insulate the wearer from the extreme environments of fires. Turnout pants are typically outfitted with knee pads and leather cuffs.

The materials used for the layers in turnout trousers and coats vary, but often include a Nomex or Kevlar composite. For example, the materials used by the Los Angeles City Fire Department, as found in their 2005 recruit handout are as follows:
 Outer shell: Southern Mills, Advanced, Nomex/Kevlar blend in a "rip-stop weave", with water repellent finish.
 Thermal insulated layer: Southern Mills Caldura batten quilt material.
 Thermal and moisture barriers are sewn together for removal for cleaning, repair and replacement from outer shell.
 Moisture barrier: Breathe-Tex material combined with Nomex/Kevlar blend laminated cloth.

NFPA 1500: Standard on Fire Department Occupational Safety, Health, and Wellness Program and similar standards mandate that firefighters wear upright protective collars and sleeves.

Trousers 

Once the need arises for firefighting personal protective equipment to be worn, a firefighter must properly don the equipment. Turnout trousers will be the first article of clothing that a firefighter will put on. Suspenders worn with the turnout trousers should be the heavy duty type in order to stand up against the heavy weights and rigorous activities they will face. Most experienced firefighters will carry various tools and equipment in their turnout trouser pockets, as well as rope and hardware they may need during an emergency. The turnout trousers, when not in use, are usually stored scrunched down around the boots for efficient and fast access when they are needed. The firefighter may then step into each boot and pull up the trousers and suspenders.

Coat 

A turnout coat is the type of jacket typically worn by firefighters. Oversized pockets allow for carrying tools and equipment, and reflective safety stripes ensure that firefighters remain visible to each other. Protective coats will usually have Velcro or zipper functions which will enable a firefighter to properly and efficiently don this piece of gear. There is also a storm flap which covers this closure area and protects it against heat, damage and loosening. Wristlets, 4 inch (according to NFPA 1500) 100% Nomex coverings along the distal end of the coat arms in with the thumb joint will slip through, fit around the firefighter's hand and provide redundant protection where the skin may show between the glove and coat. They are designed to prevent burns to the wrist, while preventing bunching and remaining flexible.

Overalls 

Overalls are available in the same materials and specifications. Usually an overall has a cord built in around the waist to make it fit better. Because of its size it is more difficult to scrunch up the overall around the boots.

Boots 

Firefighter turnout boots are usually sized as a regular shoe, but are made of rubber or leather with a Steel toe insert. The boots are slipped inside the legs of the trousers to maintain a barrier from the heat given off by the fire. When the trousers and boots are not being actively used, the trousers will fold down and out around the shins of the boots, ready for quick access for the firefighter. Owing to the enormous number of potential hazards to the feet at a fire scene, turnout boots are required to be able to handle a variety of different hazards. All boots are required to be outfitted with safety toes and a puncture-resistant midsole plate to prevent puncture from sharp objects that may be stepped on. Such emphasis on the midsole plate is made that IFSTA has deemed that "if there is doubt about midsole protection, [one should go as far as to] x-ray the boot".

Helmet 

The fire helmet's first function was to shed water in early years. Today, it is first and foremost designed to protect a firefighter from falling debris and injury to the head while fighting a fire. The secondary job of the fire helmet is to protect from heat, and hence burns to the head. It provides a hard shell, electrical, heat, and steam burn protection, and in some types of helmets, goggles, a face shield or Bourkes, a two piece short folding shield that covers the eyes. In the media these are often seen unfolded. All three provide a degree of protection for the firefighter's eyes during rescue and extrication operations. Fire helmets are constructed of various materials including non conductive materials for protection against electrical currents, carbon fiber and plastic combination for a lightweight design for comfort, and a Kevlar lining for strength and protection. More traditional US fire helmets are made out of leather.

The design of helmets vary from fire service to fire service and depends on the service or department's requirements. Some helmets are fitted with a face guard or shield to protect the firefighter's face against heat, dust, water and debris when working on a rescue or extraction call as well as when performing fire exposure protection. In the case of exposure protection the shield works better for it keeps more heat from the firefighter's face, but the goggles give more eye protection in extraction and rescue ops.

There are four basic components to firefighting helmets:

 Helmet shell: Well balanced, lightweight, and designed to provide maximum protection. Contains a Front Brim (provides protection to "eyes and facial" area), Rear Brim (Protection to "neck" from debris and water run-off), and Raised Top (Provides stability from impact from above).
 Impact ring: 3/8" thick sponge rubber Impact Ring to absorb impact energy
 Helmet liner: High Density plastic liner, made of fire retardant cotton and Nomex; completely adjustable; "NAPE Strap" adjusts to firmly cradle the occipital portion of head.
 Chin strap: 3/4" wide, black nylon w/ Velcro on one end, leather backed "postman" side buckle. The leather helps protect the skin of the cheek from the metal buckle. Previous types of helmets had been constructed of a steel outer shell with a ribbed construction for extra strength and compressed cork with a lacquer applied to the outer face of it. The design and shape of the helmet is intended to redirect water and debris from the head and neck area. It also prevents head or neck injury to the firefighter in the event of falling debris.

In Europe and some Europe-oriented countries around the world the helmet designs vary from the U.S. designs in that they are moving towards a style without brims. The pilot-style helmets have a brim at the front of the helmet, and a shape that covers more of the head. The neck is protected by a combination of a Nomex (or similar material) flash hood, and a foil-faced neck curtain which connects to the rear of the helmet. In most designs the Nomex fabric also protects the area around a SCBA facepiece and the front of the neck. A commonly used helmet is the F1 helmet although several other designs like the Dräger HPS Helmet are in use.

These helmets tend to have in-built face protection (visors) and eye protection that swivel into the shell of the helmet for protection.

EN 443:1997 (Helmets for firefighters) specifies the properties that are demanded for protection, comfort and durability. There are optional specifications to cater for national requirements. The new EN 443-2008 now replace the EN 443-1997.

Flash hood/Nomex hood and other parts 

When helmets do not provide built-in protection for the ears, neck and part of the face a protective firefighting hood is worn by firefighters. These are fitted and designed to protect the firefighter’s ears, neck, and the parts of his/her face which are not protected by the SCBA mask.

They are designed to the guidelines set by NFPA 1975. Cal/OSHA Title #8 also has regulations in the state of California. They are made of Nomex Knit Fabric which weighs 6 oz./ Sq. Yrd.; they are most often double ply with only one seam running from the top center of the face opening, over the top and down the bottom of the bib. The Nomex Knit, which is standard, is why they are commonly referred to as Nomex hoods. First, the hood is tucked into the collar. The SCBA mask is then donned, and the hood pulled over the face seal to cover any exposed skin.

Hand protection 

Many types of hand protection are available to firefighters today, the most common being the work glove and the structural firefighting glove.

Work gloves are a must for all fire services. They are used when gloves are required, but actual firefighting gloves are not. They allow better mobility to perform various types of functions from relaying hose beds to vehicle maintenance. Work gloves are usually made of leather or a leather-like material.

Extrication gloves are similar in design and appearance to auto mechanic's gloves but are made of a heavier rip-proof and puncture-resistant material such as Kevlar while still lightweight enough to allow the manual dexterity to operate rescue equipment and sometimes enough to take a victim's pulse. These are used in urban search and rescue, vehicle extrication and related applications, but are not rated for firefighting.

For an actual working fire, structural firefighting gloves must be worn. Structural gloves tend to be the last piece of protective equipment to be donned; usually because the free dexterity of the fingers is required to perform functions such as properly placing an SCBA mask on and accurately tightening a helmet strap. The gloves will fit over the wristlets and under the distal part of the coat sleeve, ensuring full enclosure of the latter arm. Gloves are designed to protect from extreme heat and various penetrating objects and to allow dexterity. Usually the latter is sacrificed to give adequate protection to heat and sharp objects. Newer gloves are more lightweight and don't lose their dexterity when they dry after becoming wet, the way leather gloves may.

Variations

Proximity suit 

Firefighters wear several other related types of protective clothing, which are not usually called turnout gear:

Proximity gear or a fire proximity suit is turnout gear with an outer layer of heat-reflecting metallic material, used in firefighting applications of extreme heat such as aircraft fires and some chemical fires.

Hazmat suit 

Hazmat suits are designed to prevent the wearer from coming into contact with hazardous materials. Class D is a work uniform with a face shield, respirator, apron, and gloves. All other levels are worn with structural firefighter PPE to varied degree. The highest level being A consisting of a gastight suit overtop of SCBA and turn out gear.

See also

 
 Firefighter's helmet

References

Further reading 

 NFPA 1500, "Standard on Fire Department Occupational Safety, Health, and Wellness Program"
 NFPA 1971, "Standard on Protective Ensemble for Structural Firefighting"
 NFPA 1975, "Standard on Station/Work Uniforms for Fire Fighters"

External links 

 Statue of Liberty Fire Brigade
 Examples of Fire Helmet Fronts

Firefighting equipment